Janusz Kłosiński (19 November 1920 – 8 November 2017) was a Polish film and theatre actor.

Biography
In 1948 he graduated from The Aleksander Zelwerowicz National Academy of Dramatic Art in Warsaw, which was located in his hometown of Łódź at the time.

Beginning in 1947, Kłosiński performed in theaters in Łódź, and, from 1964 to 1970, was the director of the New Theatre in Łódź. Beginning 1970 in Warsaw, among others, he was a member of the National Theatre in Warsaw.

He was also a member of the PZPR, including also being a Secretary of the Communist Party Committee of the Company at the National Theatre. Shortly after the introduction of martial law in Poland, Kłosiński openly supported the decision of the authorities at the time, even on public television. Public support for the introduction of martial law covered by the boycott by the audience. He retired from much of his acting after announcing it in a showing of the Wedding in 1982.

From 5 November 1961 onwards, he had continuously portrayed Józef Jabłoński in the novel radio "W Jezioranach", broadcast on Program 1 in Polskie Radio.

Kłosiński died on 8 November 2017, just 11 days short of his 97th birthday.

Notable roles

References

1920 births
2017 deaths
Actors from Łódź
Polish male actors
Recipient of the Meritorious Activist of Culture badge